The United Nations Educational, Scientific and Cultural Organization (UNESCO) World Heritage Sites are places of importance to cultural or natural heritage as described in the UNESCO World Heritage Convention, established in 1972. Cultural heritage consists of monuments (such as architectural works, monumental sculptures, or inscriptions), groups of buildings, and sites (including archaeological sites). Natural features (consisting of physical and biological formations), geological and physiographical formations (including habitats of threatened species of animals and plants), and natural sites which are important from the point of view of science, conservation or natural beauty, are defined as natural heritage. Hungary accepted the convention on 15 July 1985, making its historical sites eligible for inclusion on the list.

, there are eight World Heritage Sites in Hungary, seven of which are cultural sites and one, the Caves of Aggtelek Karst and Slovak Karst, is a natural site. The first two sites in Hungary were added to the list at the 11th Session of the World Heritage Committee, held in Paris, France in 1987. One of these two sites was the village of Hollókő, the other was Budapest, the Banks of the Danube with the district of Buda Castle (the latter site was expanded in 2002). The most recent site added to the list is the Tokaj Wine Region Historic Cultural Landscape, listed in 2002. In 2003, all eight sites were renamed to the current names listed below. Two sites are transnational. Fertö / Neusiedlersee Cultural Landscape is shared with Austria and the Caves of Aggtelek Karst and Slovak Karst are shared with Slovakia. In addition, there are ten sites on Hungary's tentative list.

World Heritage Sites 
UNESCO lists sites under ten criteria; each entry must meet at least one of the criteria. Criteria i through vi are cultural, and vii through x are natural.

Tentative list 
In addition to sites inscribed on the World Heritage list, member states can maintain a list of tentative sites that they may consider for nomination. Nominations for the World Heritage list are only accepted if the site was previously listed on the tentative list. , Hungary recorded ten sites on its tentative list.

See also 
 Tourism in Hungary

References

External links 
  Hungarian National Commission for UNESCO 

World Heritage Sites in Hungary
Hungary
World Heritage Sites